The Gibbous Rocks are a group of rocks located  north-west of Cape Belsham, Elephant Island, in the South Shetland Islands of Antarctica. They were so named by the UK Antarctic Place-Names Committee following charting by the Joint Services Expedition, 1970–71. The name is descriptive of their humped or rounded shapes (gibbous meaning humped).

References

Rock formations of the South Shetland Islands